A technikon was a post-secondary institute of technology (polytech) in South Africa. 
It focused on career-oriented vocational training.
There were 15 technikons in the 1990s, but they were merged or restructured as universities (especially universities of technology) in the early 2000s.

Etymology 
The word comes from the Greek , meaning ‘technical’. (cf. Some technical schools were called technikums elsewhere in the world.)

List of technikons 

 

In some sources, certain school names were reversed, e.g., Technikon Pretoria or Pretoria Technikon. Likewise, Witwatersrand Technikon or Technikon Witwatersrand; Natal Technikon or Technikon Natal; Free State Technikon or Technikon Free State.

History 

Some technical colleges were founded in the early to mid-20th century in the country. 
In 1967, four technical colleges (Cape, Pretoria, Witwatersrand and Natal) became "colleges of advanced technical education". Two more such colleges (Vaal and Witwatersrand) were added by 1969. These six colleges became the first technikons in 1979.

In the 1980s and 1990s, 9 more technikons were constituted, bringing up the total to 15.

Compared to universities, technikons were not seen as prestigious. The Committee of Technikon Principals felt that "the name technikon had become a stumbling block", as their graduates were not recognized by professional associations, especially internationally.

Mergers and reorganisations were announced in 2002, drastically reducing the number of technikons.
By 2006, after a process to transform the nation’s "higher education landscape", there were no technikons left.

Student compositions 
During Apartheid, the schools were divided into historically white technikons (HWTs) and historically black technikons (HBTs). The seven white technikons include the 'big four' (Cape, Pretoria, Witwatersrand and Natal), which had the most students (6000–11000 in 1991). 
The other white technikons were Free State, Port Elizabeth, and Vaal Triangle. 
SA was for distance learning, with a slight majority of whites.

Northern Gauteng and Mangosuthu were black technikons. 
ML Sultan was also nominally a HBT, but was mostly attended by Indians.

Three technikons were created in bantustans; these had the lowest enrollments: Border (Ciskei), Eastern Cape (Transkei), and North-West (initially named Setlogelo; in Bophuthatswana).

Degrees 
In 1993, the Technikon Act (No. 125) enabled technikons to provide degree studies and confer degrees. Several technikon programmes were possible:
 national higher certificate (2 years)
  (3 years): 75% of technikon enrollments were in this diploma.
 2 years of theoretical training, plus
 1 year of experiential training with an industrial employer
 national higher diploma (4 years) 
 bachelor’s degree in technology (B-Tech: 4 years)
 in some schools: master’s degree (M-Tech: 1 year minimum)
 in some schools: doctoral degree (D-Tech: 2 years minimum).

White technikons and ML Sultan Technikon offered degrees at all three levels (bachelor’s, master’s and doctorates), but others did not.

References

The years for some older school names are from:
 
 

School types
Vocational education in South Africa
Higher education in South Africa